is a private University in Kanazawa City, Ishikawa Prefecture, Japan.

External links 
 Official Website (Japanese)

Private universities and colleges in Japan
Universities and colleges in Ishikawa Prefecture
Educational institutions established in 1967
1967 establishments in Japan
Kanazawa